Asgaroth was a Spanish black metal band from Barcelona, Spain, formed in 1995. It started as a one man-project by Lord Lupus. Their international attention increased after their second album release, Red Shift, through Peaceville.

Peaceville Records
After working with Hell Awaits and Abstract Emotions for their previous productions, the band decided to send copies of the personal recordings for their Red Shift album to different record labels, including the independent record label Peaceville Records.

The British label was one of the first to respond positively to the recordings of the album and decided to sign the band for three editions. After the first 1,000 copies were sold, they went ahead and recorded a second edition to give the record a wider presentation.

For the summer of 2003, the band had already plans of making a new production, but the release dates for My Dying Bride and Katatonia new albums, scheduled preliminarily for June of the same year, caused a delay, so the record label decided to give the band more time to prepare another release. During that time, the band continued performing live in different shows and festivals with bands such as Cradle Of Filth.

Split-up
The official split-up occurred in 2007 after their tour with Type O Negative when the band posted on their Myspace page, in a way to say goodbye to their fans, a blog entry that they named "Farewell Asgaroth" in which they stated their decision of breaking up.

After the split-up, the band decided to post on their MySpace site two first stage pre-studio demos to anticipate the unreleased upcoming album of the band.

Members

Band members
 Mythral (Christopher Baque-Wildman)
Lead & Backing Vocals
Lead guitar
Keyboard
 Mr. Ax (Oscar David Raventos)
Rhythm guitar
Samplers
 Lord Lupus (Daniel Rubi Piero)
Bass
Lead Vocals 1995-1998
Backing Vocals
 Joona Etelämäki
Drums

Former members
 J. Muriana
Drums (Session) (1995)
 Katu-Marus
Drums (1996–1998)
 Julkarn
Guitar (1998–1999)
 J. Arckanus
Drums (1998–2000)
 T. Zarach
Guitar (1998–2001)
 Oisin Martinez
Drums (2001–2004)

Discography
 Songs Of War - Demo (1995)
 "Revenge"
 "I Summon The Dark Spirit"
 "Songs Of War"
 "Raise The Magic Power"

 The Quest For Eldenhor - EP (1996)
 "Legends Of The Great Magic War" - 4:42
 "The Freezing Winds Of Kiljaarn" - 6:07
 "The Last Battle (Tower Of Doom)" - 5:56
 "Soul Screams" - 2:40
 "The Return Of The Hero" - 1:08

 Trapped In The Depths Of Eve... - Album (1997)
 "Cry The Way We Greet Our Fates" - 1:25
 "Victorious Men Of Earth" - 7:17
 "Omens (Presagios)" 5:50
 "A Call In The Winds..." - 2:30
 "The Dark Force" - 7:24
 "Last Battle (Tower Of Doom)" - 6:06
 "Lost In Natura" - 3:58
 "The Choirs Of The Elemental Deities" - 3:53
 "Prelude In Dusk" - 0:55
 "Placious Echoes At Darkwoods You Greet... Silvering Moon Between My Shadows" - 6:33
 "Outroduction" - 3:16

 Absence Spells Beyond... - Album (1999)
 "Strengthened Are The Stems Of Nasturtium" - 2:21
 "Sinking Trails Of Wisdom" - 4:46
 "Absence Spells Beyond..." - 7:44
 "Epitaph..." (King Crimson cover) - 7:07
 "Cry The Way We Greet Our Fates" - 1:23
 "Victorious Men Of Earth" - 7:11
 "Omens (Presagios)" - 5:48
 "A Call In The Winds..." - 2:26
 "The Dark Force" - 7:20
 "Last Battle (Tower Of Doom)" - 5:59
 "Lost In Natura" - 3:56
 "The Choirs Of The Elemental Deities" - 3:52
 "Prelude In Dusk" - 0:55
 "Placious Echoes At Darkwoods You Greet... Silvering Moon Between My Shadows" - 6:31
 "Outroduction" - 3:13

 Red Shift - Album (2002) 

 "Naked Eye" - 4:46
 "Lured Decoy" - 6:00
 "Cyphred" - 2:29
 "Bluntness" - 6:11
 "Buried" - 6:13
 "Mindscape" - 3:41
 "Descent To Dion" - 6:57
 "I, Befouled" - 5:17
 "6 Bloodmarks" - 5:04
 "Sharpedge Solitude" - 5:35
 "Red Shift" - 5:48

Videography

References

External links
 Official website
 Official MySpace

Spanish black metal musical groups
Musical quartets
Musical groups established in 1995
Musical groups disestablished in 2007